The elections for the Chandigarh Municipal Corporation were held in December 2011. The candidates were in fray for the election to 25 seats (wards) of Chandigarh union territory.

Congress had won 11 seats out of total 25. Congress was the largest party followed by BJP with 10 seats, SAD with 2 seats, BSP with 1 and 1 independent.

Background
2006 Chandigarh Municipal Corporation election was the previous election in which Congress had won 12 seats out of total 21. Congress was the largest party followed by the BJP with 6 seats, SAD with 2 seats, BSP with 1 and 0 independent.

Results 
Congress had won 11 seats out of total 25. Congress was the largest party followed by BJP with 10 seats, SAD with 2 seats, BSP with 1 and 1 independent.

Members

Aftermath
The Chandigarh Municipal Corporation council completed its tenure of 5 years. After the council's term had expired, 2016 Chandigarh Municipal Corporation election were held.

References

Chandigarh
Elections in Chandigarh
2010s in Chandigarh
2011 elections in India